"You Tell Me" is a song originally recorded by Johnny Cash. It was written for him by Roy Orbison.

The song was recorded by Cash at Sun Records in May 1958. and released as a single (Sun 331, with "Goodby Little Darlin'" on the opposite side) in September 1959, when he already left the label for Columbia.

Background

References 

Johnny Cash songs
1959 singles
Songs written by Roy Orbison
Sun Records singles
1959 songs